The 1937 municipal election was held November 10, 1937 to elect a mayor and six aldermen to sit on Edmonton City Council and five trustees to sit on the public school board, while four trustees were acclaimed to the separate school board.  Voters also decided three plebiscite questions.

There were ten aldermen on city council, but four of the positions were already filled: Hugh MacDonald, James Ogilvie, John McCreath, and Athelstan Bissett (SS) had been elected to two-year terms in 1936 and were still in office.  John Wesley Fry had also been elected to a two-year term in 1936, but he resigned to run for mayor; accordingly, Blair Paterson (SS), who polled sixth in this election, was elected to a one-year term to finish off his term.

There were seven trustees on the public school board, but two of the positions were already filled: Izena Ross and Armour Ford had been elected to two-year terms in 1936 and were still in office.  Frederick Casselman had also been elected to a two-year term in 1936, but had resigned; accordingly, George Gleave was elected to a one-year term.  On the separate school board there were four vacancies, as A J Crowe (SS), J O Pilon, and J O'Hara were continuing.

Voter turnout

There were 24,279 ballots cast out of 51,599 eligible voters, for a voter turnout of 47%.

Results

 bold or  indicates elected
 italics indicate incumbent
 "SS", where data is available, indicates representative for Edmonton's South Side, with a minimum South Side representation instituted after the city of Strathcona, south of the North Saskatchewan River, amalgamated into Edmonton on February 1, 1912.

Mayor

Aldermen

Public school trustees

Separate (Catholic) school trustees

Hugh Currie, Charles Gariepy, John Whelihan and William Wilde (SS) were acclaimed.

Plebiscites

Mayoral Elections

Are you in favour of the Mayor being elected annually by the members of the City Council from their number?
Yes - 4,444
No - 18,383

Airport Hangar

$35,000 for an Airport Hangar
Yes - 5,308
No - 1,578

Police Signals

$25,000 for Police Signals
Yes - 3,075
No - 3,159

References

Election History, City of Edmonton: Elections and Census Office

1937
1937 elections in Canada
1937 in Alberta